Carl Paul Jennewein (December 2, 1890 – February 22, 1978) was a German-born American sculptor.

Early career
Jennewein was born in Stuttgart in Germany. At the age of seventeen, he immigrated to the United States in 1907.

He was apprenticed with the firm of Buhler and Lauter in New York where he received his early training. He took evening classes at the Art Students League of New York. Much of his early work was as a muralist, including in 1912 four murals for the Woolworth Building; the first building to be called "the Cathedral of Commerce."

In 1915 Jennewein became a naturalized U.S. citizen when he was twenty-five years old. Soon afterward he entered the United States Army. In 1916 his tour was cut short when he was awarded an honorable discharge after receiving the Rome Prize, a highly sought-after art award. This allowed him to study at the American Academy in Rome for the next three years; in Rome Jennewein turned his attention to sculpture. By 1928, Jennewein had set up his studio in the Van Nest section of the Bronx where he remained until 1978, the year of his death.

Architectural sculpture

 1923: Lincoln Life Insurance Building, Fort Wayne, Indiana
 1931: Education Building, Harrisburg, Pennsylvania
 1932: British Empire Building at Rockefeller Center, Manhattan
 1933: Pediment, Philadelphia Museum of Art, Philadelphia, Pennsylvania
 1934: Justice Department Building, Washington, D.C., (57 separate sculptural elements)
 1936: Kansas City City Hall Kansas City, Missouri
 1938: Finance Building, Harrisburg, Pennsylvania
 1939: Two stone pylons, Brooklyn Public Library, Brooklyn, New York
 1940: West Virginia State Office Building, Charleston, West Virginia
 1941: Dauphin County Courthouse, (exterior and interior), Harrisburg, Pennsylvania
 1950: Fulton County Building Annex, Atlanta, Georgia
 1954: Two panels inside the White House, Washington, D.C.
 1959: New York state seal on the front of the Court of Appeals building, Albany, New York
 1964: Two monumental figures for the Rayburn House Office Building, Washington, D.C.

Later career
The work that he is probably best known for today, and which garnered him much praise when it was unveiled in 1933, was the polychrome figures in the pediment of the Philadelphia Museum of Art. Jennewein was one of 252 sculptors who exhibited in the 3rd Sculpture International Exhibition of the Fairmount Park Art Association (now the Association for Public Art) held at the Philadelphia Museum of Art in the summer of 1949.

In the course of their careers, Carl Paul Jennewein and his partner Warren Straton produced at least five monumental eagles: one at the entrance to Arlington National Cemetery in Arlington, Virginia, another on the Arlington Memorial Bridge, connecting Arlington with Washington, D.C., the third on the Federal Office Building in New York, the fourth, a Spanish–American War Memorial in Rochester, New York.

The fifth was at Ardennes Memorial located in Neuville-en-Condroz in Belgium. They also produced somewhat smaller eagles for the gates of the Embassy of the United States in Paris.

Jennewein's sculpture, which never strayed too far from the classical ideals that he had come to so admire while in Rome, became increasingly modernized and his style comfortably fits into the Greco Deco category.

Jennewein's work received some attention when his Noyes Armillary Sphere disappeared during a riot in Washington, D.C., in the turbulent 1960s. It has not yet been recovered.

He also executed a number of medals during his career. In 1933, Jennewein sculpted Glory and Fame, the seventh issue in the long running Society of Medalists series. He also designed the inaugural medal for President Harry S. Truman in 1949.

Jennewein died on February 22, 1978, at his home in Larchmont, New York.

Controversy
In 2002, two of Jennewein's semi-nude figures in the Robert F. Kennedy Department of Justice Building in Washington, D.C., were hidden behind a curtain. This has been linked to the exposed breast on the female figure, Spirit of Justice (the male counterpart is Majesty of Law). In 2005 the curtain was removed 

Jennewein exhibited his sculptures three times in the Great German Art Exhibitions (Große Deutsche Kunstausstellung) in Munich, in 1937, 1938 and 1939. These exhibitions, held in the House of German Art (Haus der Kunst) were overt Nazi propaganda events. Obligatory for all participating artists was the membership of the Reich Chamber of Culture (Reichskulturkammer), which could only be attained by submitting an Aryan certificate. Jennewein visited the Great German Art Exhibition in 1937 and came back very enthusiastic. In a letter d.d. 8 December 1937 to the American Architect Charles Borie, Jennewein writes: “I have just returned from a great trip, and I am still talking about the things I saw in Germany….I also feel that at last I have found out the answer to: 'What is wrong with American Art’. In 1938 he was selected in Munich to a group of 25 preferred artist who were allowed to display yearly more than 5 artworks at the Great German Art Exhibitions. His displayed works, photographed by Heinrich Hoffmann (photographer), were printed on postcards issued by the House of German Art. Several works by Jennewein, identical to his bronzes displayed in the Third Reich, are currently uncommentated displayed by American institutions, including Yale University and the Metropolitan. In 1938 Jennewein sold three bronzes to Adolf Hitler: 'Tänzerin' ('Greek Dance'), 'Rast' (Resting') and 'Komödie' ('Comedy') for 600, 370, respectively 380 Reichsmark. After the war the US government apparently paid him almost 30,000 dollars compensation for the destruction of his art works bombed in Munich by Allied bombers.

Recognition
Because Jennewein's studio was located in the Van Nest section of the Bronx, an honorary street sign was designated on June 2, 2011, to reflect his 50 years of contributions to the world of art and sculpture. Among those in attendance at the renaming ceremony were Jennewein's son James and his wife. Additionally, representatives from the National Sculpture Society and Brookgreen Gardens also were present for the unveiling ceremony.

In 1929 he was elected into the National Academy of Design as an Associate member and became a full Academician in 1933.

References

Further reading
Goode, James M. The Outdoor Sculpture of Washington D.C., Smithsonian Institution Press, Washington D.C., 1974
Gurney, George, Sculpture and the Federal Triangle, Smithsonian Institution Press, Washington D.C., 1985
Howarth, Shirley Reiff, C. Paul Jennewein: Sculptor, The Tampa Museum, Tampa Florida, 1980
Kvaran, Einar Einarsson, Architectural Sculpture of America, unpublished manuscript
Proske, Beatrice Gilman, Brookgreen Gardens Sculpture, Brookgreen Gardens, South Carolina, 1968
Williams, Oliver P. County Courthouses of Pennsylvania: A Guide, Stackpole Books, Machanicsburg, Pennsylvania, 2001

External links

Web Sculpture Museum

1890 births
1978 deaths
American architectural sculptors
American male sculptors
German emigrants to the United States
Artists from Stuttgart
Art Deco sculptors
People from Larchmont, New York
20th-century American sculptors
20th-century American male artists
National Sculpture Society members
Van Nest, Bronx
Artists from the Bronx
Members of the American Academy of Arts and Letters